Dick Crippen is a former sports and weatherman anchor in the Tampa Bay, Florida television market. Crippen began his career at ABC affiliate (Now CBS) WLCY-TV Channel 10 in 1965 as one of the station's first on-air personalities. In 1981, he left for rival WFLA-TV. He anchored the evening sportscasts until the late 1990s. In the late 1970s through 1984 he was the public address announcer for Tampa Bay Rowdies home soccer games at Tampa Stadium. He also served as the Tampa Bay Buccaneers' radio play-by-play announcer for the first half of the 1978 season.

Crippen has done play by play work on the Water Channel's American Powerboat Television, ESPN's coverage of Unlimited Hydroplane Circuit, as well as NASCAR's Motor Racing Network.

He also hosted an hour-long weekly sports show called Bay Sports with Dick Crippen on the Spectrum Sports cable channel. The show aired on Wednesday evenings at 8pm and repeated on Friday and Sunday nights at 8pm. The show ended when Spectrum Sports folded in 2017.

Crippen now works in community development and as senior advisor for the Tampa Bay Rays baseball team. Dick is also a popular speaker speaking on sports, motivation and broadcasting. He is a popular host of many local events, including athletic ceremonies at the University of South Florida.

References

External links
 Crippen gets more time to tell his tales
 Dick Crippen became "Commander Astro" on Channel 10's SPACE STATION
 Crippen Senior Advisor
 Bay Sports with Dick Crippen
 Dick Crippen-Where are they now?

Year of birth missing (living people)
Living people
American sports announcers
Tampa Bay Buccaneers announcers
Tampa Bay Rays
Tampa Bay Rowdies
Television anchors from Tampa, Florida